In geometry, the Tarry point  for a triangle  is a point of concurrency of the lines through the vertices of the triangle perpendicular to the corresponding sides of the  triangle's first Brocard triangle . The Tarry point lies on the other endpoint of the diameter of the circumcircle drawn through the Steiner point. The point is named for Gaston Tarry.

See also
Concurrent lines

Notes

Triangle centers